Live from Planet X is a live album by British-American rapper/producer MF DOOM. It was released via Nature Sounds on March 5, 2005. It was recorded live in San Francisco, California on January 22, 2004. Originally titled Live at the DNA Lounge, the album was initially given away with Special Herbs, Vols. 5 & 6. It includes tracks from Operation: Doomsday, Take Me to Your Leader, and Madvillainy.

Critical reception
Peter Hepburn, writing for the website Cokemachineglow, gave the album a favorable review, saying, "Not only is Live From Planet X a fantastic album by live album standards, this could stand up against pretty much any rap album released so far this year."

Meanwhile, Stylus Magazine writer David Drake gave the album a grade of "C", saying, "For the discerning hip-hop fan, whatever their musical distribution allegiance, this is a pretty unnecessary (if occasionally interesting) addition to a catalogue already packed with fascinating material."

Track listing
The entire concert is one 38:48 long track on the CD and digital versions.

References

External links
 

2005 live albums
MF Doom albums
Nature Sounds live albums
Live hip hop albums